The battle of Mykolaiv started on the night of 26 February 2022, as part of the southern Ukraine offensive during the 2022 Russian invasion of Ukraine. It ended in Russian forces being repulsed from the city in March, and by April all but a few of its surrounding villages were under Ukrainian control.

Mykolaiv is a strategically important shipbuilding and port city on the Black Sea and on 4 March was "seen as the next key stepping-stone for Russian forces on the road to Odesa."

Prelude 

During the afternoon hours of 26 February 2022, 12 Russian tanks managed to break through in Kakhovka on the Dnieper and began heading towards Mykolaiv. Vitaly Kim, the governor of Mykolaiv Oblast, stated that the city had five hours to prepare for encirclement and urged citizens to prepare barricades and volunteer to defend the city. Artillery and other arms had also been prepared.

Battle

First assault 

By around 18:52, tanks were in the outskirts of the city and the mayor ordered citizens to stay at home and as far away from windows as possible. Shortly after, troops entered the city and a battle on the Southern Buh erupted around ten minutes later. According to some reports, tanks "passed through the city". Russian forces had also taken over the Mykolaiv Zoo.

After roughly three hours of fighting, Russian forces were driven away by Ukrainian forces, and while some Russian tanks reportedly bypassed the city, fighting continued.

By the early morning of 27 February, Ukrainian officials announced that Russian forces had been driven away from the city, with Kim posting on Telegram, "Mykolaiv is ours! Glory to Ukraine!" (Миколаїв наш! Слава Україні[!]). In the aftermath, some Russian soldiers were captured, and the city was extensively damaged.

Second assault 

On 28 February, Russian troops advanced from Kherson towards Mykolaiv, reaching the city's outskirts and launching an assault at 11:00 a.m. local time.

On 1 March, according to Ukrainian officials, a Russian column near the city of Bashtanka, just north of Mykolaiv, was defeated by Ukrainian forces. On 2 March, another Russian column was defeated at the city of Voznesensk, northeast of Mykolaiv, by Ukrainian regular army troops, members of the Territorial Defense force, and local volunteers.

The Ukrainian Navy scuttled their only frigate and the flagship of the Ukrainian Navy, Hetman Sahaidachny, in the port of Mykolaiv on or before 3 March. On that day, a photo was published showing the frigate partially sunk in port. On 4 March, the Ukrainian Defence Minister confirmed that Hetman Sahaidachny had been scuttled to prevent its capture by the Russian forces.

Ukrainian counteroffensive 

Kim later announced that Russian troops were driven out of the city but were counterattacking. Ukrainian soldiers recaptured Kulbakino Air Base. Mayor Oleksandr Senkevich said that Russian troops were attacking the city from the north, east and south. Ukrainian troops held a single swing bridge spanning the Southern Buh, the easiest route for Russian forces to reach the port of Odesa. Russian forces were later forced to retreat back beyond the city limits.

On 7 March, ten Ukrainian soldiers were killed and dozens of others were wounded in a Russian airstrike on the barracks of the 79th Air Assault Brigade at 05:15. Kim later stated that Ukrainian forces had recaptured Mykolaiv International Airport and civilians could now leave the city. At 05:00 Russian troops began shelling the city and a Kalibr cruise missile hit a military barracks, killing eight soldiers and wounding 19, while another eight were missing. Heavy clashes took place to the east of the city and a tank battle broke out at the airport. The shelling stopped around the evening, with Ukrainian forces declaring they had repelled the Russian assault.

He said that the Russian force that attacked the city was relatively weak, but warned that a stronger one could easily capture the city. The head doctor of a local hospital, Oleksandr Dimyanov, said that 250 Ukrainian soldiers and civilians had been wounded during the battle, of whom 12 died.

Senkevich told The Guardian that civilians were being evacuated through the road leading to Odesa, and about 250,000 had been evacuated.

Civilians stacked tires on city streets in the battle, and burned them using Molotov cocktails to slow down Russian troops if they entered the city, so Ukrainian troops could target their tanks. Kim meanwhile organized the defenses and motivated people through videos he posted on social media. Sgt. Ruslan Khoda, who commanded the Ukrainian forces defending the airport, stated that Russian troops seemed to be mounting probing attacks to test vulnerabilities in their defenses and they were often preceded by surveillance drones. Maj. Gen. Dmitry Marchenko, who was leading the city's defense, stated that Ukrainian forces were trying to break the morale of Russian troops by repeatedly shelling them.

On 15 March, Kim claimed that Ukrainian forces had pushed back Russian forces from the city center. On 18 March, Ukrainian forces reportedly broke through Russian lines at Mykolaiv, pushing them back into Kherson raion.

On 18 March, two Russian Kalibr missiles, fired from either nearby Kherson or Crimea, struck a Ukrainian army barracks of the 36th Separate Marine Brigade (headquartered in Mykolaiv), used to train local soldiers, located in the northern suburbs of Mykolaiv. The attack occurred during the night, while the soldiers were asleep in their bunks. Not enough time was available to sound the alarm, as the missiles were fired from too close, from the vicinity of Kherson. The Belgian newspaper Het Laatste Nieuws reported that the city morgue and the Ukrainian army stated that at least 80 Ukrainian soldiers were killed, and their bodies recovered. However, the BBC reported that out of the 200 soldiers in the barracks, only one man was pulled from out of the rubble 30 hours after the attack.

On 8 April, Ukraine claimed that "virtually no" Russian forces remained in the Mykolaiv region.

Aftermath and later attacks 

However, as of 16 April, Russian forces continued shelling the city. Cruise missile attacks also continued, although the city remained in Ukrainian control.

On 12 April, the city lost its main water supply as a result of damage to the pipeline bringing fresh water from the Dnieper. Subsequently the people in Mykolaiv were forced to rely on water from rivers and streams as well as donations from neighboring towns and cities. Kim promised to get the water supply back to half capacity in the following days using wells, water purification equipment and desalination plants. A month later, water supply from Southern Bug was established, but this water is brackish, dirty and isn't suitable for drinking or cooking. According to a BBC investigation, Russian forces deliberately broke the pipeline with explosive charge. The exiled governor of the Kherson region at that time, Dmytro Butrii, told the BBC that the Russian occupation forces did not allow a repair team to access it.

On 5 May, the Russian Defence Ministry claimed that its missiles destroyed a large ammunition depot in Mykolaiv.

On 22 June, Ukrainian authorities reported that Russian forces launched seven missiles at Mykolaiv. According to the Russian Defence Ministry, the strike conducted by the Russian Aerospace Forces killed up to 500 servicemen of the 59th Motorized Brigade located in the Okean shipbuilding plant and destroyed a fuel terminal in the city.

On 28 June, shelling damaged Central City Stadium and an abandoned military base. On 29 June, a Russian rocket strike hit a five-storey residential building, killing at least 8 people and injuring 6.

On 15 July, the city's two largest universities were struck by missiles: Admiral Makarov National University of Shipbuilding and Mykolaiv National University.

On 29 July, five people were killed and seven were injured at a bus stop in Mykolaiv after Russians shelled the city. Another strike on 30 July killed Oleksiy Vadaturskyi, the owner of Ukrainian agricultural company Nibulon, along with his wife.

On 17 August, two missiles hit Petro Mohyla Black Sea State University. Two days later, it was shelled again with two S-300 missiles.

On 1 November, new shelling partially destroyed a historic gymnasium (1892), a polytechnic college and damaged neighboring residential buildings. One person was reported to be killed.

On 11 November, shelling of the city collapsed part of a five-story residential building, killing 9 people.

The relentless attacks ended in November as the front line was pushed back in the course of the 2022 Kherson counteroffensive.

Casualties and war crimes 
Olha Dierugina, the director of the forensic institute of Mykolaiv, told Agence France-Presse that their morgue had received 120 bodies during the battle, including 80 soldiers and 30 civilians. Some of the dead also included Russian soldiers.

A cancer hospital and an eye clinic were bombed on 12 March. On 13 March, Kim stated that a gas turbine factory had been bombed by the Russians. He later said that nine people had been killed in the attack.

According to a report by The New York Times on 16 March, 132 bodies were housed at the city's morgue.

On 29 March, a Russian missile strike had hit the regional administration's headquarters in Mykolaiv. 37 people had been killed and at least 33 injured.

See also 

 Battle of Voznesensk (2022)
 Battle of Kherson

References 

 
March 2022 events in Ukraine
February 2022 events in Ukraine
Use of cluster munition during the Russian invasion of Ukraine